Liaoning Radio and Television or LRTV  is located in Shenyang, Liaoning province, China. The television was launched on October 1, 1959. And it is one of the earliest launched televisions in People's Republic of China. LRTV now has 6 radio channels and 8 TV channels for the public and 5 Pay TV channels for all the viewers in China. LRTV broadcasts only in Mandarin (usually with Chinese subtitles, and occasionally English as well for some features, such as The Ultimate Fighter: China). LRTV's TV and radio broadcasts can be streamed for free online on their main website and app.

LRTV's radio channels
 Comprehensive Radio (Voice of Liaoning）
 Economic Radio
 Classic Music Radio
 Traffic Radio
 Rural Radio
 Information Radio

LRTV's TV channels
 Liaoning Satellite Television (General Channel)
 City Channel
 Movie & TV series Channel
 Life Channel
 Sports Channel
 Education & Youth Channel
 North Channel
 Yijia Shopping Channel
 Economic Channel
 Public Channel
 Mobile TV Channel (only air on buses in Shenyang)
 Game Play Channel (pay channel)
 E-Sports Channel (pay channel)
 Internet Chess & Poker Channel (pay channel)
 Home Money Management Channel (pay channel)
 New Cartoon Channel (pay channel)

See also
Television in the People's Republic of China

References

External links
 Official Website  

Television networks in China
Television channels and stations established in 1959
Mass media in Shenyang